The Wind in the Willows is a 1995 British animated television film directed by Dave Unwin and written by Ted Walker, and based on the 1908 novel of the same name, a classic of children's literature by Kenneth Grahame. It was produced by the now defunct TVC (Television Cartoons) in London.

The film includes live action bookending segments with Vanessa Redgrave as the grandmother (who narrates), Alan Bennett, Michael Gambon, Rik Mayall, Michael Palin,  Tom Stourton and Barry Foster, which changes into an animated setting as soon as the grandmother opens the book.

Plot
Whilst out on a riverboat with her three grandchildren Emma, Alexandra and Edward, a woman tells them the story of The Wind in the Willows.

Disenchanted with spring cleaning, Mole ventures out of his hole for the first time and stumbles across a river and a friendly inhabitant, Ratty. The two animals recognize the wanderlust they share despite their differences in natural breeding and bond with each other. They call on Mr. Toad, who to Ratty's annoyance has chosen to abandon the river and takes them on a road trip with a gypsy caravan. A passing motor car causes the caravan to crash and Toad to develop a bitter obsession for motor cars. 

Back at the riverbank, Ratty becomes disillusioned with the faith in his beliefs expressed by Mole and the locals of the river; he strongly but irrationally considers emigrating south but Mole brings him back to his senses.

By Winter, Mole's patience to wait for Mr. Badger to come wears thin and he tries to venture to Badger's home in the heart of the Wild Wood, where he gets overwhelmed by the hostility of the local weasels around him and hides in fear. Ratty finds Mole and the two friends inadvertently come across Mr. Badger's house and he invites them in. Ratty and Mole tell Badger the whole story of Toad's collection of Motor Cars and how his manic behaviour would get him into trouble. After a pleasant visit, the two friends head for home, whereupon Mole feels homesick from leaving his hole for too long, but Ratty comforts him with a visit to the place.

When Springtime approaches, Mr. Badger visits Ratty and Mole and the three animals confront Toad to persuade him to end his destructive obsessions, but to no avail. Failing to see the extended consequences of his actions, Toad escapes his house, forcing Ratty, Mole, and Badger to chase him, and gets himself in serious trouble for stealing and crashing a motor car, and is sentenced to 20 years in prison. Meanwhile, Mole and Ratty row in the river at night in search of Otter's son Portly, who they later find with Pan.

Eventually, Toad escapes from prison disguised as a washerwoman, aided by the Jailer's daughter. Lacking money, Toad hitches a ride on an Engine with a good-natured engine driver, who helps him escape from the police who pursue him on another engine. The next morning Toad comes across a horse-towed barge owned by an obese barge woman. Having failed to do some washing up and being laughed at and thrown off by the barge woman for his rude remarks, Toad steals her horse and rides off. When he reaches the road, he sees a motor car, carrying the very judge who sentenced him. The judge's driver invites Toad for a ride, but when he takes the wheel he crashes the car into a pond, and is once more pursued by the police. He falls into the river and swims to safety.

Soon, Toad is reunited with his friends, but his home Toad Hall has been taken over by the weasels in his absence. Sneaking through an underground passage into Toad Hall, Toad, Ratty, Mole and Badger drive the egotistic Chief Weasel and his cowardly band of Wild Wooders out and Toad reclaims his house, receiving a celebration for his return the next day.

The film ends with the woman and her grandchildren having a picnic on the riverbank before returning to the boat.

Cast

Live-action
Vanessa Redgrave as Grandmother/Narrator
Jemima Ffyne as Alexandra
Jordan Hollywood as Emma
Tom Stourton as Edward
Barry Forster as Boatman

Voice cast
Alan Bennett as Mole
Michael Palin as Rat
Sir Michael Gambon as Badger
Rik Mayall as Mr. Toad
James Villiers as Magistrate
Emma Chambers as Gaoler's Daughter
Judy Cornwell as Barge Women
Enn Reitel as Otter, Rabbit, Policeman, Gaoler
David Sinclair as Clerk, Rabbit #2, Sergeant
Mark Lockyer as Car Owner, Rabbit #3, Policeman, Driver, Town Crier, Chief Weasel

Sequel
The film was followed by The Willows in Winter in 1996, based on the 1993 novel of the same name by William Horwood. It received positive reviews like the first film, and Rik Mayall and Loraine Marshall won Emmy Awards for Best Voice Acting and Art Direction respectively.

Like its predecessor, the movie opens with the narrator telling her grandchildren a story. Set an unspecified amount of time after the first tale, the animals have been joined by Mole's recently orphaned, unnamed nephew, whom Toad temporarily allows to stay with him at Toad Hall. However, he packs him off back to Mole End when he sees an aeroplane fly overhead and prioritises taking to the skies. Winter comes and one night, just as Mole finally agrees to tell his nephew about how he met Ratty and the others, Portly, the son of Mole's friend Otter, suddenly bursts in out of the blizzard outside and, having helped himself to a strong drink, falls asleep halfway through telling Mole something about Ratty and Otter. Worried that they may be in trouble, Mole leaves his nephew to look after Portly and ventures out into the night to get to Ratty's house. Having got to the frozen river and with no other way to get across, Mole attempts to walk across the ice, only to fall through a thin patch and be lost from view.

The next day, Ratty and Otter arrive at Mole End looking for Portly, it turns out they simply wished that Mole could join them for a drink the previous night and that Portly ran off to invite Mole without their approval. Horrified that Mole has not returned, Ratty and Otter recruit the aid of Badger to find their friend and Badger intimidates the denizens of the Wild Wood (who, apart from the Chief Weasel, now all live in fear and awe of the group following the Battle of Toad Hall) into helping with the search.

Meanwhile, Toad has bought an aeroplane, but is furious that only a qualified pilot may fly it for him. The pilot agrees to keep his head down while flying the plane, to give the impression that Toad is flying it. Ratty and Badger spot Toad flying over, and although disenchanted with Toad's aloofness, they realise his plane could come in handy to track Mole's whereabouts, and so they go to Toad Hall to requisition the plane with the pilot in command. Toad, giving into his recurring consuming control lusts, knocks out the pilot and commandeers the plane with Ratty in the leading seat on aerial lookout. Toad gets lost in his head and starts doing wild stunts with the plane, causing Ratty to fall out before Toad fleetingly realises he's gone. Ratty has a parachute, but on the way down his mind channels out in a near-death experience, becoming convinced subsequently that he has seen 'Beyond' and giving him a fresh glimmer of hope. Ratty, Badger, and the others are enraged with Toad's complete loss-of-mind and shout out angrily "You can go hang!"

Badger and Ratty eventually find a letter that Mole took with him and concealed in the trunk of a tree before attempting to cross the river - the letter contains his will. Badger is consequently left certain that Mole is dead and, despite Ratty's refusal to believe this, arranges a funeral for him. Mole however has drifted to a small island downriver. Ratty's rowboat, having drifted downstream after the river started to thaw, eventually reaches the island and Mole uses it to save himself. That night, Badger holds Mole's funeral and delivers a grand eulogy in honour of his friend, but Portly gets bored and wanders off. He sees Mole arrive in the rowboat and, mistaking Mole for a vengeful ghost, panics and runs back to the funeral, where everyone except Badger flees from the 'ghost'. Badger furiously orders the 'spirit' to leave so they can finish Mole's funeral, and Mole reveals himself, much to everyone's relief, although Badger still fixedly believes it was bare luck that Mole and Rat survived the tribulations.

Meanwhile, Toad has crash-landed into a large greenhouse in town and to his horror, the owner is none other than the judge who sentenced him to prison for motorcar theft. Toad poses as a pilot trying to prove himself and he is regarded as a hero. Recuperating in the judge's house, Toad is invited to dinner, but does not wish to blow his cover, so he blocks up the fireplace in his room and requests a chimney sweep. Getting the sweeper drunk, Toad switches clothes with him and attempts to escape, but his vanity gets the better of him and causes him to confess who he really is. The judge then attempts to arrest him, but Toad narrowly escapes.

The riverbankers arrange a party at Badger's house for the Wild Wooders (their promised reward for searching for Mole), so they go to Toad Hall to borrow some of Toad's furniture and cutlery. The house is flooded due to the bursting pipe in the attic during the fall, so they take everything for safekeeping, Ratty also finds a letter with an American postmark for Toad. Toad, meanwhile, gets roped into attending a wedding to bring good luck, but the judge is the groom's father and Toad is finally caught for wrecking a wedding. The residents of the River Bank read about Toad's adventures in the paper and are shocked to discover that Toad is being denounced as a menace to society (the article implies that Toad murdered the sweep).  Badger reads about Toad's arrest and, knowing things can only get worse if he doesn't do something, he quickly writes a letter to an old friend of his, the editor of the 'Times' newspaper.

A miserable Toad appears in court, where he is manipulated into forfeiting his right to have a lawyer and is denounced by everyone present, including the sweep's supposed widow. Toad tearfully pleads guilty to all the charges, also confessing to having abandoned the search for Mole and possibly killed Ratty, which confuses the court into an uproar as they knew nothing about Toad's friends causing Toad himself to shout back at them, saying he'll report them to Satan. A letter from the 'Times' editor is suddenly delivered, revealing that both he and Badger vouch for Toad's good character, and the judge's butler also testifies on Toad's behalf, revealing that the sweep is still alive and reminding everyone that Toad's actions saved several lives (even if he did it by mistake). Toad is acquitted of all charges and allowed to return to Toad Hall, learning before he goes that the butler knew who he was from the start.

Badger's party is a flop, with Badger not accustomed to handling large social gatherings and everyone missing Toad. Toad returns to his ancestral home and, horrified to find everything ruined and missing, assumes the worst for all of his recklessness to his riverbanker friends. He accidentally knocks over a candle which sets the house on fire, melodramatically refusing rescue and resigning himself to a fiery death as everyone discovers what's happened. Ratty and Mole, however, use the tunnel under Toad Hall to get in and heroically save Toad. Toad is left miserable as he has no insurance and will be unable to restore Toad Hall, but the letter Ratty found solves everything - a rich American relative of Toad has died and left his vast fortune of $5,000,000 (£3,211,098 Or £392,075,383 in 2021) to Toad. Toad, and everyone celebrates with over joy as Toad Hall collapsed into ashes.

References

External links

1995 animated films
1995 films
1995 television films
1990s children's films
Animated films based on children's books
British animated films
British children's films
Films based on The Wind in the Willows
Films scored by Colin Towns
Films with live action and animation
Mattel Creations films
1990s British animated films
Television shows based on The Wind in the Willows
1990s British films